The Bihać Republic (Serbo-Croatian Latin: Bihaćka Republika, Cyrillic: Бихаћка Република) was a short-lived republic that existed between November 1942 and January 1943 in a liberated area of Nazi-occupied Yugoslavia. It was established by the Partisan resistance movement following the liberation of Bihać. Bihać became its administrative center and the first session of the Anti-Fascist Council of the People's Liberation of Yugoslavia (AVNOJ) was held there on 26 November 1942.

Liberation of the territory 
In the summer and fall of 1942 Partisan forces improved largely its organization and tactics. Organized in mobile brigades, Partisans were able to attack and overpower isolated Axis garrisons of battalion size and, in some cases, even stronger. Partisan units in western Bosnia and Croatia were largely reinforced with arrival of 6 brigades from eastern parts of Yugoslavia in summer 1942.

Bihać, the central town of the territory, was liberated on 4 November 1942 after a two-day battle of 8 Krajina and Croatian brigades against the 4th Ustaša Brigade and 12th Croatian Home Guard Regiment. Some towns were liberated earlier (Vojnić, Vrginmost, Korenica, Drvar, Glamoč, Bosanski Petrovac), and others were liberated in continuation of the Bihać operation: Bosanska Krupa on 5, Cazin on 6, and Slunj on 14 November. Several towns were liberated during separate attacks: Jajce on 26 November, Livno on 15 December, Tomislavgrad on 19 December 1942, and Teslić on 1 January 1943. Udbina and Bosansko Grahovo were evacuated by Ustaša and Italian units under Partisan pressure. Some towns were attacked unsuccessfully: Bosanski Novi and Dvor na Uni on 26–28 November, and Sanski Most on 10–22 December.

With these operations, large swaths of territory, from Karlovac in the west to Prozor in the east, were cleared of Axis forces. Partisans established control over an area that was some 250 km long and 50–70 km wide. Some towns were retaken by Axis forces in local attacks: (Jajce was reoccupied on 6 December, and Teslić on 8 January by Germans), but most of the territory was reoccupied in large offensives (Weiss I and Weiss II). Germans retook Bihać on 29 January, Drvar on 27 February, and Livno on 5 March 1943.

See also 
 Republic of Užice

References

Sources 
 
 
 
 
 

States and territories established in 1942
States and territories disestablished in 1943
Geographic history of Bosnia and Herzegovina
Bihac, Republic of
Bihac, Republic of
Bihać
Bosnia and Herzegovina in World War II
Republic of Bihac
Communism in Bosnia and Herzegovina
Communism in Croatia
History of Bosanska Krajina